Thomas Joseph Riley (November 30, 1900 – August 17, 1977) was an American prelate of the Roman Catholic Church. He served as an auxiliary bishop of the Archdiocese of Boston from 1959 to 1976.

Biography
Thomas Riley was born in Waltham, Massachusetts, to Thomas and Agatha (née Loughry) Riley. Following his graduation from Boston College in 1922, he studied at St. John's Seminary in Brighton. He was ordained to the priesthood on May 20, 1927.

Riley served as a curate at St. Joseph's Church in Roxbury (1929–31) and earned a Doctor of Philosophy degree from the Catholic University of Louvain in 1933. He taught philosophy and moral theology at St. John's Seminary for eleven years, then serving as vice-rector (1944–51) and rector (1951–58) of the seminary. In 1958, he became pastor of St. Peter's Church in Cambridge.

On November 4, 1959, Riley was appointed auxiliary bishop of Boston and titular bishop of Regiae by Pope Pius XII. He received his episcopal consecration on the following December 21 from Cardinal Richard Cushing, with Bishops Eric Francis MacKenzie and Jeremiah Francis Minihan serving as co-consecrators. In addition to his episcopal duties, he continued to serve as pastor of St. Peter's Church. After reaching the mandatory retirement age of 75, he retired as auxiliary bishop of Boston on June 28, 1976.

Riley later died at age 76.

References

1900 births
1976 deaths
People from Waltham, Massachusetts
20th-century American Roman Catholic titular bishops
Participants in the Second Vatican Council
Boston College alumni
Catholic University of America alumni
Catholics from Massachusetts